Terrence "Terry" John Daniher (born 15 August 1957) is a former Australian rules footballer who played with the South Melbourne and Essendon Football Clubs in the Australian Football League (AFL). Terry was also an assistant coach for the Essendon, Collingwood, St Kilda and Carlton Football Clubs. Terry's brothers, Neale, Anthony and Chris, also played for Essendon in the AFL. He is a member of the Australian Football Hall of Fame and the Wagga Wagga Sporting Hall of Fame and is a Champion of Essendon. Terry is currently the owner of Terry Daniher Cleaning Services, a cleaning company based in Melbourne.

Early life and childhood
Terry was born the first child of James "Jim" Daniher and Edna Daniher (née Erwin) on 15 August 1957 at West Wyalong Base Hospital. Terry attended St Joseph's Catholic School, Ungarie for his primary education before going to Ungarie Central School until year ten, after which he became a farmer.

It was during his childhood that Terry showed his love for sport, namely Australian rules football, playing in the Northern Riverina Football League (NRFL) on Saturdays while playing rugby league at school carnivals. It was during his time in the NRFL that Terry won several best & fairest award, including the senior football Evans Medal in 1974, before playing with Ariah Park-Mirrool in the South West Football League (New South Wales) for the 1975 season. It was during this season that Terry was approached by the South Melbourne Football Club to play for them.

VFL/AFL playing career
From 1976–1992 Terry played for South Melbourne and Essendon in the VFL/AFL, playing 313 games and playing in the 1983, 1984, 1985 and 1990 Grand Finals, two of which he won. He also made history alongside his brothers when they became the first quartet of brothers to play for the same team in a State of Origin match and in a home-and-away game. It was after the 1992 season that Terry retired.

Retirement, coaching and beyond
After his professional career, Terry returned to the Riverina to play for the Wagga Tigers in the Riverina Football League (RFL), becoming Captain-Coach and leading the Tigers to five premierships out of six Grand Finals.

After this he returned to Melbourne to become an assistant coach for Essendon, coaching a reserves premiership in 1999, and serving as assistant coach of the team that won the 2000 Grand Final. In 2003, Terry became an assistant coach for the Collingwood Football Club before becoming an assistant coach for the St Kilda Football Club, where he would stay from 2004–2005. Terry got his final coaching job when he became an assistant coach for the Carlton Football Club, where he stayed from 2006–2007. After this, Terry begun his own cleaning business, Terry Daniher Cleaning Services.

Champions of Essendon 
In 2002 an Essendon panel ranked him at 11 in their Champions of Essendon list of the 25 greatest players ever to have played for Essendon.

See also 
List of Australian rules football families

Further reading
 Daniher, Terry Neale Daniher, Anthony Daniher and Chris Daniher. The Danihers: The Story of Football's Favourite Family. Sydney: Allen & Unwin, 2009.

References

External links
 

1957 births
Living people
Australian rules footballers from New South Wales
Sydney Swans players
Essendon Football Club players
Essendon Football Club Premiership players
Crichton Medal winners
Champions of Essendon
All-Australians (1953–1988)
Australian Football Hall of Fame inductees
Leigh Matthews Trophy winners
Victorian State of Origin players
New South Wales Australian rules football State of Origin players
Australian people of Irish descent
Australia international rules football team players
Two-time VFL/AFL Premiership players